Tortoise Media is a British news website co-founded by former BBC News director and The Times editor James Harding.

A funding campaign for the site launched on Kickstarter in October 2018 raised £539,035. The site went live in April 2019. The site's slogan is "Slow down, wise up."

References

2019 establishments in the United Kingdom
British news websites